Antonio Martín y Coll (apparently died in the 1730s) was a Spanish Franciscan, composer and musician.

Biography
Martín y Coll grew up in a monastery and eventually became a Franciscan friar. The last years of his life were spent in the monastery of San Francisco el Grande in Madrid. He probably died there after 1733 and before 1735.

Works
Though primarily an organist, Martín y Coll also wrote a pair of treatises (1714 and 1734). However, his modern fame rests on four volumes of the Flores de Música (Musical flowers), a compilation of hundreds of keyboard pieces, nearly all of them without an author. Since the pieces were probably famous at the time of the compilation, listeners would have known the composer. Modern scholarship has been able to attribute a large number of the works to composers such as Corelli, Handel, Frescobaldi, Cabanilles, and Cabezón.

The fifth volume of the Flores de Música, called Ramillete oloroso: suabes flores de música para órgano, contains mostly organ music (as the title indicates). The works in this volume are generally assumed to be Martín y Coll's own compositions. Two of these works are variations on La Folia, a long Diferencias sobre las Folías and a shorter Folías.

Scores

References

1730s deaths
Year of birth unknown
Year of death unknown
18th-century classical composers
18th-century keyboardists
18th-century male musicians
Spanish Baroque composers
Spanish male classical composers
Spanish classical organists
Male classical organists
Spanish Franciscans